The mixed doubles badminton event at the 1996 Summer Olympics was held from 26 July to 1 August 1996. The tournament was single-elimination. Matches consisted of three sets, with sets being to 15 for mixed doubles. The tournament was held at the Georgia State University Gymnasium.

Seeds
  Park Joo-bong / Ra Kyung-min (silver medalist)
  Trikus Heryanto / Minarti Timur (quarterfinals)
  Liu Jianjun / Sun Man (bronze medalist)
  Chen Xingdong / Peng Xingyong (fourth place)

Results

Finals

Top Half

Bottom Half

References

Sources
Badminton at the 1996 Atlanta Summer Games: Women's Doubles

Badminton at the 1996 Summer Olympics
1996
Mixed events at the 1996 Summer Olympics